Ken Judge (15 January 1958 – 15 January 2016) was an Australian rules footballer and coach.

Playing career

Hawthorn Football Club
Recruited from Western Australian Football League club East Fremantle, Judge played for Hawthorn Football Club from 1983 until 1986, and made an immediate impact playing in a premiership in his first season and winning the Hawks' Best First Year Player award. Judge also played in the Grand Finals of 1984 and 1985 but struggled for selection in 1986.

Brisbane Bears
he moved to the Brisbane Bears, where he played without making much impact in 1987 and 1988.

Coaching career

Carlton Football Club assistant coach (1995)
On the strength of a recommendation from Carlton Football Club senior coach David Parkin, who was also a former Hawthorn captain and premiership coach.

Hawthorn Football Club senior coach (1996-1999)
Judge was appointed senior coach of Hawthorn from 1996 until 1999, finishing 8th and therefore reaching the finals in his first year. However, in the following years Hawthorn struggled and finished 15th in the 1997 season and 13th in the 1998 season before just missing out of the finals in 1999, finishing 9th. Judge then resigned as Hawthorn senior coach, with a year to run on his contract. Judge was then replaced by Peter Schwab as Hawthorn Football Club senior coach.

West Coast Eagles senior coach (2000-2001)
Judge then returned to Western Australia as senior coach of the West Coast Eagles, after Mick Malthouse stepped down as West Coast Eagles senior coach at the end of the 1999 season. Judge coached West Coast Eagles for the 2000 and 2001 AFL seasons. He was unsuccessful during his time there, where West Coast Eagles under Judge finished 13th in the 2000 season and 14th in the 2001 season before he was sacked at the end of the 2001 season and replaced by John Worsfold as West Coast Eagles senior coach.

Radio career
Following the end of his coaching career, Judge worked for the Australian Broadcasting Corporation (ABC) as a sports commentator for ABC Radio Grandstand. In 2009, he apologised for an on-air gaffe when he referred to fellow commentator Jon Dorotich as "bigger than Hitler's last gas bill".

Death 
Judge died on his 58th birthday in Perth, Western Australia on 15 January 2016 from multiple myeloma. He had been diagnosed with the blood condition in mid-2010 and had undergone several bouts of chemotherapy treatment. He was laid to rest on 25 January in Perth.

References 

1958 births
2016 deaths
West Coast Eagles coaches
Brisbane Bears players
East Fremantle Football Club players
Hawthorn Football Club players
Hawthorn Football Club Premiership players
Hawthorn Football Club coaches
Western Australian State of Origin players
East Fremantle Football Club coaches
Australian rules footballers from Western Australia
Australian rules football commentators
Deaths from cancer in Western Australia
Deaths from multiple myeloma
One-time VFL/AFL Premiership players